Child's Play was an Australian game show based on a U.S. show of the same name. It aired on the Seven Network in 1984 and was hosted by Jeff Phillips.

Seven Network original programming
1984 Australian television series debuts
1984 Australian television series endings
1980s Australian game shows
Australian children's game shows
English-language television shows